Hilda Tchoboian is a French-Armenian community organizer.

She was the chairwoman of the EAFJD (European Armenian Federation for Justice and Democracy), a grassroots organization based in Brussels, Belgium.

She has notably denounced human rights violations and mass desecration towards the Armenian minorities of Turkey, Georgia and Azerbaijan.

Notes

External links 
European Armenian Federation for Justice and Democracy.
Financial Mirror article.

Living people
1950 births
People from Aleppo
Community activists
French people of Armenian descent
Knights of the Ordre national du Mérite